The 2016 IBSF World Under-18 Snooker Championship was an amateur snooker tournament that took place from 16 August to 20 August 2016 in Mol, Belgium  It was the 2nd edition of the IBSF World Under-18 Snooker Championship.

The tournament was won by number 30 seed Jackson Page who defeated the number 1 seed Yun Fung Tam 5–4 in a final frame decider.

Results

Round 1
Best of 7 frames

References

2016 in snooker
Snooker amateur tournaments
Mol, Belgium
2016 in Belgian sport
International sports competitions hosted by Belgium